An Myong-hwa (born 13 November 1974) is a North Korean gymnast.A graduate of Kim Hyong Jik University of Education majoring in athletics, She competed in six events at the 1992 Summer Olympics.

References

External links

1974 births
Living people
North Korean female artistic gymnasts
Olympic gymnasts of North Korea
Gymnasts at the 1992 Summer Olympics
Place of birth missing (living people)
Asian Games medalists in gymnastics
Gymnasts at the 1990 Asian Games
Asian Games silver medalists for North Korea
Medalists at the 1990 Asian Games
20th-century North Korean women